Gakhal is a village positioned in Jalandhar West Block of Jalandhar district in Punjab. Placed in rural region of Jalandhar district of Punjab, it is one among the 141 villages of Jalandhar West Block of Jalandhar district. The village is 3 km away from Jalandhar-Kala Sanghia and is 6 km away from the Jalandhar railway station. The most common surname of people in the village is Gakhal. In 2004, Gakhal had a population of 2,201.Gakhal pind is also known as Gakhalan. Gakhals are part of the jatt clan. As per 2009 stats, Gakhal village is also a gram panchayat.

The total geographical area of village is 186 hectares. There are about 444 houses in Gakhal village.  Jalandhar is nearest town to Gakhal.

Demographics 

Schedule Caste (SC) constitutes 13.45% of total population in Gakhal village. Village Gakhal currently doesn't have any Schedule Tribe (ST) population.

Connectivity 

 Public Bus Service - Available within 2–3 km distance
 Private Bus Service - Available within village
 Jalandhar Railway Station, Available within 5 – 6 km distance

Education 

  Govt. Sr. Sec. School, Gakhal-Dhaliwal
  St. Marry's Convent School, Gakhal

Work profile 

In Gakhal village out of total population, 685 were engaged in work activities. 96.93% of workers describe their work as Main Work (Employment or Earning more than 6 Months) while 3.07% were involved in marginal activity providing livelihood for less than 6 months. 685 workers engaged in Main Work, 251 were cultivators (owner or co-owner) while 5 were Agricultural labourer.

References
https://www.pmgsyonline.nic.in/aspnet/citizens/NAT/06NPW/SPWRoadwise.aspx?state=PB&district=8&package=0&year=2004
https://www.mypind.com/jal/jalPage281.htm

Villages in Jalandhar district